The Court of Appeal is a court in Ireland that sits between the High Court and Supreme Court. Its jurisdiction derives from Article 34.4. It was established in 2014, taking over the existing appellate jurisdiction of the Supreme Court in 2014 and replacing the Court of Criminal Appeal and the Courts-Martial Appeal Court (subject to transitional provisions). Appeals to the Supreme Court are at that Court's discretion.

Establishment

The superior courts provided under the Courts of Justice Act 1924 and the 1937 constitution were the High Court and the Supreme Court. By the 1990s, there was a large backlog of cases in which the Supreme Court was required to hear appeals from the High Court. The Supreme Court heard a greater number of cases than its counterparts in other common law states. A working group which reported in 2009 recommended introducing a new court to hear most appeals of High Court judgments, freeing up the Supreme Court to restrict itself to cases of constitutional importance. This would require amending the constitution to remove the general right to appeal to the Supreme Court and allow that court the discretion to decide which cases to hear itself.

A constitutional amendment along the lines of the 2009 report was approved in a referendum on 4 October 2013. The Court of Appeal Act 2014 gave effect in primary legislation to the new constitutional provision. The Rules of the Superior Courts and schedule of court fees were then amended by statutory instrument. The court came into operation on 28 October 2014.

In February 2014, the government announced that serving High Court judge Sean Ryan would be designated as the president of the new court. On 29 October 2014, the Government nominated Ryan and eight ordinary judges of the Court of Appeal, who were appointed by the President of Ireland on the same day. A ninth ordinary judge, John A. Edwards, was nominated on 11 November 2014, and appointed on 4 December 2014.  Nine of the appointees to the new Court were judges of the High Court; one was promoted directly from the Circuit Court.

Cases
On 28 October 2014, the Supreme Court transferred 258 cases to the Court of Appeal. It later transferred more, to a total of about 1,650 cases.

On 10 March 2015, the Court of Appeal upheld a May 2014 High Court ruling that section 2(2) of the Misuse of Drugs Act 1977 was unconstitutional, thus annulling statutory instruments made under section 2(2) which criminalised various designer drugs. Although the government may seek to appeal this to the Supreme Court, it had also made contingency plans for emergency legislation after the High Court ruling, and an Act was rushed through the Oireachtas on 10–11 March 2015. International media reported on the one-day decriminalisation of MDMA and methamphetamine.

In September 2016, a paper in The Irish Law Times claimed "the Court of Appeal never had a prayer of solving the problem that was put to the people in this referendum, which was solving the backlog", with 1,814 cases pending at the end of 2015 compared to 2,001 cases at the start. A spokesperson for the court said it would process cases faster when it "finds its rhythm". In October 2017, the court's President said it was "coming to the point of being overwhelmed" by its backlog of cases, with about 600 added annually compared to about 320 dealt with. The Supreme Court offered to take back some of the 650 cases still outstanding from those it had transferred in 2014.

In 2014, before the introduction of the Court of Appeal, the waiting time for appeals from the High Court was 5 to 7 years; in 2018, it averaged one year for appeals to the Supreme Court and 2 years to the Court of Appeal.

Composition
The Court of Appeal consists of its president, up to 15 ordinary judges, and two  members: the Chief Justice (head of the Supreme Court) and the President of the High Court. The President of the Court of Appeal is  an additional judge of both the Supreme Court and the High Court. The Courts Act 2019 increased the number of ordinary judges from 9 to 15.

Current members
  denotes President

Ex officio members

References

External links
Irish Statute Book
 Thirty-third Amendment of the Constitution Act, 2013
 Court of Appeal Act 2014
Courts Service of Ireland
 Court of Appeal Judgments
 Supreme Court, Court of Appeal and High Court Fees
 Court of Appeal Forms
 Court of Appeal Legal Diary
British and Irish Legal Information Institute (BAILII)
 Irish Court of Appeal cases

Ireland
Courts of the Republic of Ireland
2014 establishments in Ireland
 
Courts and tribunals established in 2014